Synapturichthys kleinii, Klein's sole, is a species of sole found in the Mediterranean Sea and along the Atlantic coast of Africa, just barely entering the Indian Ocean in South Africa.  This species grows to a length of  TL, though most only reach around  TL, and is of economic importance.  This species is the only known member of its genus.

References
 

Soleidae
Taxa named by Paul Chabanaud
Monotypic fish genera